Tersefanou is a village in the Larnaca District of Cyprus, located 2 northwest of Kiti.

References

Communities in Larnaca District